The Social Justice Society (SJS) (Tagalog: Katarungang Panlipunan) is a registered national political party in the Philippines composed of citizens of the Philippines from all walks of life who are bound by a common concern or interest in the promotion of social justice for all sectors of Philippine society under the concept of "equal justice for all."

Candidate for the 2013 Philippine general election

Senatorial Slate (1)
Samson Alcantara (lost)

References

Political advocacy groups in the Philippines